Stepping stone(s) may refer to:

 Stepping stones, stones placed to allow pedestrians to cross a watercourse

Places
 Stepping Stone, Virginia, US, an unincorporated community
 Stepping Stones (islands), Antarctic and sub-Antarctic

Buildings
 Stepping Stones (house), of Bill and Lois Wilson of Alcoholics Anonymous, in Bedford Hills, New York, US
 Stepping Stones Light, a lighthouse on Long Island Sound, New York, US
 Stepping Stones Museum for Children, Norwalk, Connecticut, US
 "Stepping Stones", home of Jacques Futrelle in Scituate, Massachusetts, US

Film and theatre
 The Stepping Stone, a 1916 American silent film
 Stepping Stones (film), a 1931 British musical
 Stepping Stones (musical), a 1923 Broadway musical

Music

Albums
 Stepping Stone (album) or the title song (see below), by Lari White, 1998
 Stepping Stones (album), by Wendy Matthews, 1999
 Stepping Stones: Live at the Village Vanguard, by Woody Shaw, 1979

Songs
 "Stepping Stone" (Duffy song), 2008
 "Stepping Stone" (Eminem song), 2018
 "Stepping Stone" (Jimi Hendrix song), 1970
 "Stepping Stone" (Lari White song), 1998
 "(I'm Not Your) Steppin' Stone", a song written by Tommy Boyce and Bobby Hart, 1966; recorded by many performers
 "Stepping Stone", by Argent from Argent, 1970
 "Stepping Stone", by AM
 "Steppin' Stone", by Black Label Society from Hangover Music Vol. VI, 2004
 "Stepping Stone", by Clannad from Sirius, 1987
 "Stepping Stone", by Natasha Bedingfield from N.B., 2007
 "Stepping Stones", by Bert Jansch and John Renbourn from Bert and John, 1966
 "Stepping Stones", by the Headboys, 1979
 "Stepping Stones", by Johnny Harris, 1970

Schools
 Stepping Stone Educational Centre, Port Harcourt, Rivers State, Nigeria
 Stepping Stone Inter College, Gorakhpur, Uttar Pradesh India
 Stepping Stone Model School, Alipurduar, West Bengal, India

Other uses
 Stepping Stone Purse, an American horse race
 Stepping-stone squeeze, a contract bridge technique
 Stepping Stones (charity), now Safe Child Africa, a UK charity for child rights in Nigeria
 Stepping Stones: Interviews with Seamus Heaney, a 2008 book by Dennis O'Driscoll
 Stepping Stones, a 1977 UK political report by John Hoskyns and Norman S. Strauss

See also
 Island hopping (disambiguation)
 Stepstone (disambiguation)